Jean-François Lamour (born 2 February 1956, Paris) is a former French fencer and current French politician and cabinet minister. As a fencer, Lamour has made multiple athletic achievements, the most note-worthy being making world championship in 1987. He won one bronze, two silver, and two gold medals in sabre Olympic events between 1984 and 1988. 

Retiring, he entered politics serving as the sports and youth counsellor to the Mayor of Paris from 1993 to 1995. In 2002, he became the minister of sport, and in 2004, he was given responsibility for youth in addition to this.

He's married to Dr. Isabelle Spennato, a former French fencer and current president of the French Fencing Federation.

Athletic career
Lamour started learning fencing at eight years old, his first success coming later in 1971, when he was 15 years old. That year, he won the French junior championship in sabre fencing.

4 years later, Lamour reached semifinals at the 1975 World Championship in Bucharest. 

He went on to set a national record, winning the Champion of France title 13 times between 1977 and 1992.

In the 1980s, Lamour returned empty-handed from the Olympic Games in Moscow. He was the only member of the French team to return home without a medal.

In 1983, Lamour returned again to the World Championship -this time in Vienna - and placed fifth. In Lausanne in 1987, he became World Champion. 

He began training under new coach László Szepesi, who came from Hungary to head the French national team.

Lamour won gold at the 1984 Summer Olympics in Los Angeles. Days later, he fenced in the team tournament that saw France win an Olympic silver medal.

In 1988, Lamour was awarded the Master of Saber prize. Several months later, he won a second Olympic gold medal in Seoul. He was appointed France's Minister of Sports in 2002.

References

External links
 "For Future of Fencing" International Charity Fund website
 

1956 births
Living people
Fencers from Paris
French male sabre fencers
Olympic fencers of France
Fencers at the 1980 Summer Olympics
Fencers at the 1984 Summer Olympics
Fencers at the 1988 Summer Olympics
Fencers at the 1992 Summer Olympics
Olympic gold medalists for France
Olympic silver medalists for France
Olympic bronze medalists for France
Olympic medalists in fencing
Medalists at the 1984 Summer Olympics
Medalists at the 1988 Summer Olympics
Medalists at the 1992 Summer Olympics
Deputies of the 13th National Assembly of the French Fifth Republic
Deputies of the 14th National Assembly of the French Fifth Republic
Honorary Knights Commander of the Order of the British Empire
Councillors of Paris
Members of Parliament for Paris